Howard Hollis Callaway (April 2, 1927 – March 15, 2014) was an American businessman and politician. He served as a Republican member of the United States House of Representatives for the 3rd district of Georgia. He also served as the 11th United States Secretary of the Army.

Life and career

Callaway was born in LaGrange, Georgia, the son of Virginia Hollis and Cason Callaway, and the grandson of Fuller Earle Callaway. Callaway attended Episcopal High School, graduating in 1944. Callaway then attended Georgia Tech and the United States Military Academy, where he earned a degree in military engineering in 1949. He served in the United States Army during the Korean War. He was discharged in 1953 and returned to Georgia to help his parents develop and run Callaway Gardens.

Political career in Georgia
Like many Southerners, Callaway was initially a Democrat, but switched to the Republican Party due to national Democrats' more liberal stances against segregation. In 1964, he was elected as a Republican to represent Georgia's 3rd congressional district in the United States House of Representatives, succeeding Tic Forrester. Callaway was the first Republican to represent Georgia in Congress since Reconstruction, riding a Republican wave in the Deep South resulting from the appeal of Barry Goldwater to conservative Southerners.

Rather than run for re-election, Callaway ran as the Republican candidate in the 1966 Georgia gubernatorial election. The election was exceptionally close due to a split within the state Democratic Party between supporters of segregationist Lester Maddox and liberal former governor Ellis Arnall; after Maddox won the Democratic nomination, Arnall continued his campaign as a write-in candidate. Ultimately, Callaway won a plurality but not a majority of votes cast, which under Georgia law meant that the election was thrown to the Georgia General Assembly. After a series of lawsuits reaching the United States Supreme Court, the authority of the legislature was ultimately upheld, and Maddox was elected governor by the heavily Democratic legislature.

Callaway was succeeded in Congress by Jack Brinkley.

Later career
Callaway resided in Colorado in the 1970s. In 1973, he was appointed by Richard Nixon to serve as the 11th United States Secretary of the Army. He served under Nixon and Gerald Ford and was succeeded by Norman R. Augustine in 1975. 

Callaway served as Ford's campaign manager, but resigned following accusations that he had used undue political influence to ensure the expansion of a ski resort; he was replaced by Rogers Morton. 

Callaway ran for the Republican nomination in the 1980 United States Senate election in Colorado. He was supported by Senator William L. Armstrong, but ultimately lost the nomination to Mary Estill Buchanan. After that, he served as the chairperson of the Colorado Republican Party until 1987.

Callaway died in March 2014 from complications of intracerebral hemorrhage in Columbus, Georgia, at the age of 86.

References

External links
 Retrieved on 2008-07-02

|-

|-

|-

1927 births
2014 deaths
Members of the United States House of Representatives from Georgia (U.S. state)
United States Secretaries of the Army
United States Military Academy alumni
United States Army officers
United States Army personnel of the Korean War
People from LaGrange, Georgia
Georgia Tech alumni
Georgia (U.S. state) Democrats
Georgia (U.S. state) Republicans
Colorado Republicans
Colorado Republican Party chairs
Republican Party members of the United States House of Representatives
People from Pine Mountain, Harris County, Georgia
20th-century American politicians
Callaway family